"Smoking on My Ex Pack" is a song by American singer-songwriter SZA from her second studio album, SOS (2022). Placed as the album's eleventh track, it is a rap and boom bap song with a chipmunk soul production style, incorporating hard-hitting drum beats and a sped-up sample of Webster Lewis's "Open Up Your Eyes" (1981). Prior to SOS, SZA had been known as an R&B artist who makes "sad girl" music, labels she wanted to dispel because she viewed them as reductive; she found the R&B categorization in particular racially insensitive. As such, she wanted to experiment with "aggressive" hip hop music on the album, and "Smoking on My Ex Pack" was conceived out of that desire. The song was produced by Jay Versace, to whom she credited her decision to start incorporating rap in her discography.

In the lyrics, SZA makes braggadocious comments about her sexual desirability and insults her ex-lovers in various ways, such as by saying one of them had a "dick [that] was wack". Originally over 2 minutes long, she decided to cut it in half because she felt unsure if she was good at rapping. Critics in contemporary reviews felt otherwise. They found the songwriting in "Smoking on My Ex Pack" effectively harsh and thought it showcased SZA's potential to become a proper rapper—some deemed it a highlight of SOS or of her discography. After the album's release, the song charted in the United States and Canada, with a number 71 peak on the Billboard Global 200, and was included in set lists for a 19-show North American tour in promotion of the album.

Background 

SZA released her debut studio album, Ctrl, in 2017. Primarily an R&B album that deals with themes like heartbreak, it received widespread acclaim for its vocals and eclectic musical style, as well as the emotional impact and confessional nature of its songwriting. The album brought SZA to mainstream fame, and critics credit it with establishing her status as a major figure in contemporary pop and R&B music and pushing the boundaries of the R&B genre. Her next studio album was highly anticipated, and she alluded to its completion as early as August 2019 during an interview with DJ Kerwin Frost.

From April to May 2022, SZA told media outlets that she had recently finished the album in Hawaii and said that it was coming soon. Wanting to experiment with genres she had not yet incorporated in her discography, she envisioned it to be an amalgamation of various disparate musical styles, or in her words, "a little bit of everything". While some tracks were balladic or soft, certain others had an "aggressive" sound. Apart from the "traditional" R&B that had been a staple of SZA's past works, the album also contained prominent elements of hip hop music.

Music and production 

SZA wanted to include rap as a major element of her second studio album, SOS (2022). She refused to be described solely as an R&B artist because she was a Black woman, deeming it racially insensitive: "I love making Black music, period. Something that is just full of energy. Black music doesn't have to just be R&B[...] Why can't we just be expansive and not reductive?" The album contains three rap songs—one in the beginning, one in the end, and one in the middle. "Smoking in the Ex Pack" is the rap song in the middle. Built around a chipmunk soul production, it incorporates a looped, sped-up sample of "Open Up Your Eyes" (1981) by Webster Lewis alongside hard-hitting drum beats that give it a boom bap musical style.

"Smoking on My Ex Pack" was produced by Jay Versace, a record producer and a former comedian, whom SZA credits with getting her interested in creating "aggressive" rap music. Versace created the beat for the song sometime in 2022, three years after the two first met up for the album's recording sessions. The production was inspired by boom bap music he had heard from his childhood, many of which reminded him of songs that would play on the car radio during drives with his father. For "Smoking on My Ex Pack", he wanted SZA's take on these childhood songs: "I literally made that for her[...] That was specifically for her."

Versace chose "Open Up Your Eyes" as the song's sample because of his interest in love ballads from the latter half of the 20th century, citing the "really crazy instrumentation in their music". He became hooked with its horns and vocals in particular, so he created a sample of it in Ableton and started forming the beat around it. Once he was done, he sent the audio file to SZA, who started writing the lyrics almost immediately. About the production, she texted him: "Your beats are so easy to write to. Why am I already writing lyrics right now?"

Lyrics 

SZA said that while creating SOS, she learned that sometimes she could act like a villainous "bitch", and she had to come to terms with this perception of herself. According to her, many songs in the album centered around themes of revenge and "being pissed" to a degree that she had never felt before. She described how these feelings manifested in its tracks: "It is in the way I say no[...] It's in the fucked up things that I don't apologize for." Versace encouraged her to "talk her shit" on "Smoking on My Ex Pack", the lyrics to which she wrote to dispel a narrative that she only makes "sad girl music". Its initial version was over 2 minutes long, but SZA scrapped the song's first half because she did not feel confident enough in her rapping skills.

The released version of "Smoking on My Ex Pack" is 1 minute and 23 seconds long.  Spin compared its lyrics to blind items, or articles that do not disclose the identity of their subject and are frequently gossip pieces. Braggadocio is a major element of the songwriting. In the song's verse, SZA communicates her desirability to other men and announces "them hoe accusations weak" and "them bitch accusations true". After revealing how she embodies those traits by saying she presents an unfriendly attitude and has sex with men she deems heart throbs, she finds various ways to insult her ex-partners. 

SZA raps about having "your favorite rapper" blocked on social media, saying she heard a rumor that his "dick was wack". She deliberately ignores many athletes who try to flirt in her messages and insist she text them back; because her lesser side loves "all the cap", SZA refuses to make exceptions for any of the men she does not acknowledge. Then, she addresses an ex-boyfriend seeking to rekindle their relationship: "He screamin', 'Gеt back together', I'm screamin', 'Back of thе bus, trick! SZA compares her former romantic partners to a character from The Simpsons named Sideshow Bob, a conservative TV personality and clown who becomes a criminal as the series progresses:

Release and reception 

During a Billboard cover story published in November 2022, SZA revealed the album title, as well as the release date which was scheduled sometime next month. She posted the album's track list on Twitter on December 5, and SOS was released four days later. Out of 23 songs, "Smoking on My Ex Pack" appears as the eleventh track. Upon its release, the song charted in the United States and Canada, with peaks at numbers 52 and 61, respectively. It peaked at number 23 on the US Hot R&B/Hip-Hop Songs chart and number 71 on the Billboard Global 200. "Smoking on My Ex Pack" had its live performance debut during a 19-show North American tour in support of SOS, performed while SZA went backstage for an outfit change, which the stage screen captured.

Critics were positive about SZA's experimenting with rap on "Smoking on My Ex Pack", lauding it for showcasing her more confident side. They welcomed its lyrics for marking a departure from her other works, which primarily focused on angst and vulnerability, and its placement between tracks that discuss insecurities in her relationships. Much of the praise focused on the harshness and unfiltered nature of her songwriting, which they found clever, funny, or emotionally impactful. Vulture and Okayplayer found the song a highlight of her discography; Complex listed its rap verse as one of the best of 2022 and argued that SZA's usage of wordplay further strengthened her lyrics. Asking SZA to make more lyrically similar songs, Vulture wrote: "in the context of her career, it's also a flex; her best is not her limit — it's the floor."

Another point of commentary was SZA's flow and delivery, attributes that led critics to think her first attempts at rap music demonstrated her potential to become a good rapper. In the words of  The Sydney Morning Herald, "she takes to rapping for the first time and she sounds like a natural, with impeccable flow and a healthy dose of venom." For this reason, Nylon and HipHopDX called "Smoking on My Ex Pack" a highlight of SOS—HipHopDX recommended its readers to play it on repeat. Some critics liked how the harsh rapping in "Smoking on My Ex Pack" juxtaposed the soft sound of the album tracks that come before it. Slant Magazine argued that this provided the album's otherwise weak middle section some much-needed catharsis. Meanwhile, a few others considered the song's length as its primary weakness, feeling like it did not reach its full potential due to its shortness.

Credits 

 Solána Rowe lead vocals, songwriting
 Jahlil Gunter songwriting
 Raina Taylor songwriting
 Clarence Scarborough songwriting
 Jay Versaceproduction
 Dylan Neustadter engineering
 Josh Deguzman engineering
 Rob Bisel engineering
 Katie Harvey assistant engineering
 Noah McCorkle assistant engineering
 Syd Tagle assistant engineering
 Jon Castelli mixing
 Dale Becker mastering

Note

Charts

Notes

References 

2022 songs
SZA songs
Songs written by SZA
Songs written by Skip Scarborough
Hip hop songs